Paradise Hotel (Spanish: Hotel Paraíso) is a 2019 Peruvian comedy film written, directed and co-produced by Daniel Rehder in his directorial debut. Starring Kareem Pizarro, Jely Reátegui, Marco Zunino and Francisca Aronsson. It premiered on January 24, 2019, in Peruvian theaters.

Synopsis 
Guillermo will live a thousand adventures with his cousins, during their vacations in a hotel in Ica, to fall in love with Andrea. Guillermo will have to face his insecurities and Nahel who also has feelings for the young woman.

Cast 
The actors participating in this film are:

 Kareem Pizarro as Guillermo
 Fabiana Valcárcel as Andrea
 Brando Gallesi as Nahel
 Francisca Aronsson as Lucía
 Carolina Cano as Gisella
 Katia Condos
 Matías Raygada
 Jely Reategui
 Andrés Salas
 Pietro Sibille
 Marco Zunino

Reception 
Paradise Hotel drew a total of 41,465 viewers to the theater.

References

External links 

 

2019 films
2019 comedy films
Peruvian comedy films
2010s Spanish-language films
2010s Peruvian films
Films set in Peru
Films shot in Peru
Films set in hotels
Films about children
2019 directorial debut films